Yoko Shindo Takahashi (1960September 13, 2018) was a Japanese archaeologist who specialized in Islamic glasswork.

Shindo graduated from Waseda University in 1979. She earned a master's degree from the same institution in 1985, and a doctorate in 2010. She began working at the university in 1986, then moved to the Middle Eastern Culture Center. In 2009 she worked at the Research Institute for Islamic Archaeology and Culture, and later worked at the Toyo Bunko. Her archaeological excavations mainly took place in Egypt. She also planned exhibitions of Islamic glass in Japan.

On September 8, 2018 Shindo was in an accident with a tram on the last day of a glass conference in Istanbul. She died on September 13, 2018.

Bibliography

References 

1960 births
2018 deaths
Japanese archaeologists
Japanese women archaeologists
Waseda University alumni